A/S Trikken (lit: The Tram) was a Norwegian company that operated the Drammen trolleybus between May 1, 1916, and July 1, 1947. The company was started by the electrical company Øverby & Larsen, that bought the remains of the bankrupt Drammens Elektriske Bane who had operate the trolleybuses since 1909. A/S Trikken operated the system until the end of June 1947 when their licence was not renewed and the municipality took over operation through the company Drammen Kommunale Trikk.

References

Defunct bus companies of Norway
Trolleybus transport in Norway
Companies based in Drammen
Transport companies established in 1916
Transport companies disestablished in 1947
1916 establishments in Norway
1947 disestablishments in Norway